The 370th Infantry Regiment was the designation for one of the infantry regiments of the 93rd (Provisional) Infantry Division in World War I.  Known as the "Black Devils", for their fierce fighting during the First World War and a segregated unit, it was the only United States Army combat unit with African-American officers. In World War II, a regiment known as the 370th Infantry Regiment was part of the segregated 92nd Infantry Division, but did not perpetuate the lineage of the 8th Illinois or World War I 370th, only sharing its numerical designation.

The regiment grew out of the 8th Infantry Regiment, Illinois National Guard (also known as the "Fighting 8th") which saw action in the Spanish American War, where it first made United States' history with its all-black officer corp. The World War I unit is memorialized by the Victory Monument in Bronzeville, Chicago.

8th Infantry Regiment, Illinois National Guard

This was an all-black militia regiment which was first founded in the 1870s.  The unit was reformed in 1898 by the Governor of Illinois for service in the Spanish American War where it first made history for its all-African-American command; the Eighth Illinois was the only regiment in the nation to be commanded by African American officers.

The Eighth Regiment Armory, located in the Black Metropolis-Bronzeville District of Chicago, Illinois, built in 1914, was the first armory in the United States built for an African-American military regiment.

World War I

On 25 July 1917, the regiment was mustered into service for World War I. The Headquarters, Headquarters Company, Supply Company, Machine Gun Company, Medical Department Detachment, and Companies A through H came from Chicago, Company I came from Springfield, Company K from Peoria, Company L from Danville, and Company M from Metropolis, Illinois. When the unit was federalized for service during World War I, it was eventually enumerated as the 370th. "In World War I the African American 8th Infantry...fought under the French. As in the late 19th century, it was still the only American unit entirely commanded by black officers."

"During World War I, as the 370th Infantry, it served with distinction with the French 34th, 36th, and 59th Infantry Divisions, earning streamers for the battles of Lorraine and Oise-Aisne. Sectors occupied and engagements participated in were Saint Mihiel with the French in 1918, Argonne Forest, St. Gobain Forest, Bosi de Mortier, Mont des Signes, Oise-Aisne Canal, Laon, Grandlup, Soissons, and Oise-Aisne and Lorraine offensives. One battalion of the Regiment, under the command of Lieutenant Colonel Otis B. Duncan, was engaged in pursuit of the retreating enemy far in advance, when halted by the Armistice."

For its fierce fighting in the Argonne, the regiment was given the name "Black Devils" by the Germans. The Victory Monument, created by sculptor Leonard Crunelle, was built to honor the service of Eighth Regiment of the Illinois National Guard during World War I. It is located in the Black Metropolis-Bronzeville District in the Douglas community area of Chicago, Illinois.

Interwar period

The 370th Infantry sailed home on the SS France and was demobilized at 11 March 1919 at Camp Grant, Illinois. It was reorganized as the 8th Infantry Regiment, Illinois National Guard, in 1919-1921, and the headquarters was federally recognized on 25 August 1921 at Springfield, Illinois. The regiment was assigned to the General Headquarters Reserve, and its designated mobilization training station was Fort Huachuca, Arizona. On 23 July 1929, the regiment was reassigned to the Second Army. On 1 October 1933, the headquarters was relocated to Chicago. The regiment conducted its summer training at Camp Grant, Illinois. On 6 October 1940, the regiment was converted and redesignated as the 178th Field Artillery Regiment.

World War II

184th Field Artillery Regiment

On 6 January 1941, the 184th Field Artillery Regiment was inducted into federal service at Chicago and moved to Fort Custer Training Center. On 16 January 1943, the regiment was broken up into the 930th and 931st Field Artillery Battalions, and the Headquarters and Headquarters Battery was disbanded. On 28 February 1944, the 930th Field Artillery Battalion was converted and redesignated as the 1699th Engineer Combat Battalion. It was inactivated on 19 June 1945 in Germany. On 20 March 1944, the 931st Field Artillery Battalion was converted and redesignated as the 1698th Engineer Combat Battalion. It was inactivated on 25 September 1945 in Germany.

370th Infantry (Army of the United States)

This second incarnation of the 370th Infantry does not have any lineal relation to the 8th Illinois, World War I 370th Infantry, or subsequent units, but only shares its number. It was activated in October 1942, along with the rest of the 92nd Infantry Division, ten months after the American entry into World War II. After nearly two years of training, it departed the United States in July 1944 and arrived on the Italian Front, landing at Naples on 1 August, attached to the Task Force 42 of the 1st Armored Division. The 370th entered combat on 24 August 1944 as part of the U.S. Fifth Army. It participated in the crossing of the Arno River, the occupation of Lucca and the penetration of the Gothic Line, in the pursuit of an enemy which was retreating from that area. It was later attached to the 92nd Division in Task Force 45, the Fifth Army unit responsible for the Ligurian coastal sector, the left flank of Allied troops in Italy. On 13 October, the remainder of the 92nd Division concentrated for patrol activities. Elements of the 92nd Division moved to the Serchio sector, 3 November, and advanced in the Serchio River Valley against light resistance, but the attempt to capture Castelnuovo did not succeed. Patrol activities continued until 26 December when the enemy attacked (Winter Line), forcing units of the 92nd Division to withdraw. The attack ended on 28 December. The attacking forces were mainly from the Alpine Division "Monte Rosa", a division of the Italian Fascist Army (4 battalions) with the support of 3 German battalions. Aside from patrols and reconnaissance, units of the 92nd attacked in the Serchio sector, 5–8 February 1945, against the Italian Bersaglieri Division "Italia", another unit of the army of the Italian Social Republic, but enemy counterattacks nullified division advances.

On 1 April, the 370th RCT and the attached 442nd Infantry (Nisei) attacked in the Ligurian coastal sector and drove rapidly north against light opposition of German 148th Infantry Division supported by Italian coastal units. The 370th took over the Serchio sector and pursued a retreating enemy from 18 April until the collapse of enemy forces, 29 April 1945. Elements of the 92nd Division entered La Spezia and Genoa on 27 April and took over selected towns along the Ligurian coast until the enemy surrendered, 2 May 1945. Between August 1944 and May 1945 the 92nd Division suffered 3,200 casualties, factoring losses from units attached to the Division brings the totals up to 5,000 casualties.

On the Italian Front, the Buffalo soldiers had an opportunity to make contact with men of many nationalities: beyond other segregated Americans like the Japanese descendants, they had contact with the also segregated troops of British and French colonial empires (Black Africans, Moroccans, Algerians, Indian and Nepali Gurkhas, and others) as well as with exiled Poles, Greeks and Czechs; anti-fascist Italians and the non-segregated troops of the Brazilian Expeditionary Force.

Postwar to 1947

On 25 August 1945, the Headquarters and Headquarters Battery, 184th Field Artillery Regiment, was reconstituted in the Illinois National Guard. In 1947, elements of the former 184th Field Artillery were converted, reorganized, and redesignated as the 178th Infantry Regiment, with headquarters organized and federally recognized 31 March 1947 at Chicago.

Notable members
World War I
Charlie Alexander, band sergeant for the 370th in 1917 and later a well-known jazz musician
George Washington Antione, doctor with the 370th
Rufus Herve Bacote, doctor with the 370th
Lieutenant Colonel Otis B. Duncan commanded the 3rd Battalion of the 370th in combat.
Harry Haywood (6 February 1898 – 1985), a leading figure in both the Communist Party of the United States (CPUSA) and the Communist Party of the Soviet Union (CPSU)
Sergeant Matthew Jenkins received the Distinguished Service Cross and the Croix de Guerre for leading his platoon in combat, taking a German position, and holding it until relieved 36 hours later
James Alexander Owen, doctor with the 370th
1st Lieutenant William J. Powell, engineer and aviation pioneer, was wounded in a gas attack as an infantry officer.

 World War II
Vernon Baker, U.S. Army Medal of Honor recipient
Marshall Allen, jazz musician and leader of The Sun Ra Arkestra

See also 
Eighth Regiment Armory (Chicago)
Victory Monument (Chicago)

References

Bibliography 

 Haywood, Harry. Africana: the encyclopedia of the African and African American experience. Volume 3 (2nd ed.). Oxford University Press, 2005. 

 Motley, Mary Penick. The Invisible Soldier: The Experience of the Black Soldier, World War II. Wayne State University Press, 1975

Further reading

External links 

370
History of Chicago
African Americans in World War I
African-American history in Chicago
United States Army regiments of World War I
African-American United States Army personnel